The women's team time trial of the 1988 UCI Road World Championships cycling event took place on 27 August 1988 in Renaix, Belgium.

Final classification

Source

References

1988 UCI Road World Championships
UCI Road World Championships – Women's team time trial
UCI
UCI Road Women's